This is a list of airports in Afghanistan, grouped by type and sorted by location.

Description
Afghanistan has four international airports which are expected to increase in the future. The Kabul International Airport serves the population of Kabul and the surrounding areas; the Maulana Jalaluddin Balkhi International Airport serves northern Afghanistan; the Ahmad Shah Baba International Airport in Kandahar serves the southern parts of the country; and the Khwaja Abdullah Ansari International Airport in Herat serves the population of western Afghanistan. The Afghan government is seeking to build a new international airport in the Mohammad Agha District of Logar Province.

There are also about 16 regional domestic airports which are spread over the country in various provinces, which serve the smaller, more remote areas. Some of these airports have gravelled airside facilities and operate under visual flight rules.

Airports across Afghanistan

See also 

 Transport in Afghanistan
 List of airports by ICAO code: O#OA - Afghanistan
 Wikipedia:WikiProject Aviation/Airline destination lists: Asia#Afghanistan

References 

 
  - includes IATA codes
 
 Great Circle Mapper: Airports in Afghanistan - IATA and ICAO codes
 World Aero Data: Afghanistan - ICAO codes
 SkyVector - Dwyer Airport
 SkyVector - Salerno Airport
 SkyVector - Shank Airport
 Nili terminal construction
 Civil Aviation Authority - Andkhoi Airport

Airports
 
Afghanistan
Airports
Afghanistan